The Winston Churchill's Britain at War Experience was from 1992 to 2013 a themed museum located in central London, which recalled the London Blitz.

Description
The museum gave a realistic picture of life in war-torn London.

The museum closed in January 2013.  Its collections have been transferred to The Bay Trust.

References

External links
"The Britain at War Experience"
The Bay Trust

Defunct museums in London
World War II museums in London
History museums in London
Museums in the London Borough of Southwark
2013 disestablishments in England